Tisgaon is a village in Rahata taluka of Ahmednagar district in the Indian state of Maharashtra.

Population
As per 2011 census, population of village is 2,138, of which 1,096 are male and 1,042 are female.

Economy
Main occupation of village is agriculture and allied work.

Transport

Road
Village is located near Nagar - Manmad highway. It is connected to nearby villages by village roads.

Rail
Shrirampur railway station is the nearest railway station to a village.

Air
Shirdi Airport is the nearest airport to a village.

See also
List of villages in Rahata taluka

References 

Villages in Ahmednagar district